Ege or EGE may refer to:

People
 Ege (given name), list of people with the given name
 Ege (surname), list of people with the surname

Places 
 Ege, Indiana, an unincorporated community
 Mount Ege, in Antarctica

Other uses 
 Eagle County Regional Airport, in Colorado
 EGE (Unified State Exam) of Russia
École de guerre économique, French academic institution
 Ege University, in İzmir, Turkey
 TCG Ege (F-256), a Turkish frigate

Turkish masculine given names
Turkish-language surnames